Hook of Holland is a town in the southwestern corner of Holland, hence the name; hoek means "corner" and was the word in use before the word kaap – "cape", from Portuguese cabo – became Dutch. The English translation using Hook is a false cognate of the Dutch Hoek, but has become commonplace (in official government records in English, the name tends not to get translated and Hoek van Holland is used). It is located at the mouth of the New Waterway shipping canal into the North Sea. The town is administered by the municipality of Rotterdam as a district of that city. Its district covers an area of 16.7 km2, of which 13.92 km2 is land. On 1 January 1999 it had an estimated population of 9,400.

Towns near "the Hook" include Monster, 's-Gravenzande, Naaldwijk and Delft to the northeast, and Maassluis to the southeast. On the other side of the river is the Europort and the Maasvlakte. The wide sandy beach, one section of which is designated for use by naturists, runs for approximately 18 kilometres to Scheveningen and for most of this distance is backed by extensive sand dunes through which there are foot and cycle paths. On the north side of the New Waterway, to the west of the town, is a pier, part of which is accessible to pedestrians and cyclists.

The Berghaven is a small harbour on the New Waterway where the Rotterdam and Europort pilots are based. This small harbour is only for the use of the pilot service, government vessels and the Hook of Holland lifeboat.

History 

The Hook of Holland area was created as a sandbar in the Maas estuary, when it became more and more silted after St. Elizabeth's flood of 1421. All kinds of plans were designed to improve the shipping channel to Rotterdam. In 1863 it was finally decided to construct the New Waterway which was dug between 1866 and 1868. The route ran through the Hook of Holland, where a primitive settlement, Old Hook (Oude Hoek - nowadays the Zuidelijk Strandcentrum), was created.  Many workers and senior employees of the Rijkswaterstaat  settled in Old Hook.

The Hook initially fell under the administrative authority of 's-Gravenzande. An attempt by the inhabitants to transform the place into an independent municipality failed and, on 1 January 1914, Hook of Holland was added to Rotterdam. After the First World War the village started to develop into a seaside resort. It has since been informally known as 'Rotterdam by the sea'.

During World War II, the Hook was one of the most important places for the Wehrmacht to hold because of its harbour, which comprised an important and strategic part of the Atlantic Wall. The German Army installed three 11" guns (removed from the damaged battleship Gneisenau) as shore batteries to protect the port area from invasion. 

Hook of Holland already had a ward council in 1947 and has been a borough since 1973. In 2014, it was replaced by an "area committee".

Kindertransport monument

The kindertransport, with which Jewish children from Germany, Austria, Poland and Czechoslovakia could be brought to England from December 1938 until the outbreak of the World War II, usually went from the children's home stations to the Netherlands by train. The crossing to Harwich then largely took place from Hoek of Holland. The transports were supported by the Dutch government and by volunteers. The first transport, which started on December 1, 1938 at the Berlin Anhalter Bahnhof, reached England on December 2, 1938. When the transport was allowed, the British government stipulated that the children could not be older than seventeen and that their parents could not come along. The Nazis stipulated, among other things, that the children at the railway station were not allowed to say goodbye to those left behind. By the time the war broke out in 1939, approximately 10,000 children had been brought to Britain in this way.

Transport links

Railways
The Schiedam–Hoek van Holland railway is a 24-kilometre branch line from Schiedam Centrum station via Vlaardingen and Maassluis. The final two stations on the line are located within the town. Hoek van Holland Haven, the penultimate station, is close to the town centre, adjacent to the ferry terminal and the small harbour, the Berghaven. Hoek van Holland Strand, the terminus, is closest to the beach.

The railway line opened for service in 1893 and was electrified in 1935. International trains ran from Berlin and Moscow to connect these with London via the ferry service. From 1928 to 1939 and from 1962 to 1979, Hook of Holland was the northern terminus of the Rheingold Express to Frankfurt and Geneva. Services on the line to Rotterdam Centraal station were operated by NS every half-hour during the day until April 2017, when the line was closed for conversion to metro standards. It was reopened in September 2019, as an extension of the Rotterdam Metro. The metro line service from Hook of Holland does not offer direct connections to Rotterdam Centraal.

Ferry
Hook of Holland is also the location of an international ferry terminal, from which service to eastern England has operated since 1893 except for the durations of the two World Wars. Currently, two routes are operated: one, a day-and-night freight and passenger service to Harwich, Essex, and the other, a night, freight-only service to North Killingholme Haven, Lincolnshire. The passenger ferry service is operated by Stena Line as part of the Dutchflyer rail-ferry service between Hook van Holland Haven station and Harwich International station in England, from which Greater Anglia provides service to Liverpool Street station in central London.

A local ferry operated by RET links the Hook with the Maasvlakte part of the Port of Rotterdam.

Motorways
The A20 motorway begins approximately 10 kilometres east of Hook of Holland near Westerlee, heading east towards Rotterdam and Utrecht. It connects to the A4 heading north towards The Hague and Amsterdam 17 kilometres east of the town.

Climate

Notable people 
 Jan Knippenberg (1948–1995), an ultrarunner and historian. In 1974, he ran from Hook of Holland to Stockholm, Sweden in 18 days
 Richard de Mos (born 1976), a PVV politician and climate-change sceptic, brought up in Hook of Holland 
 Jesper Leerdam (born 1987), a footballer who has played for the Dayton Dutch Lions, Excelsior Maassluis and SW Scheveningen
 Roy Kortsmit (born 1992), a professional footballer who currently plays as a goalkeeper for NAC Breda
 Bryan Janssen (born 1995), a former professional goalkeeper who plays for Kozakken Boys

References

Bibliography

External links

Hook of Holland VVV (tourist information) site
Harwich - Hoek ferry service

Rotterdam
Boroughs of Rotterdam
Populated coastal places in the Netherlands
Populated places in South Holland
Port cities and towns in the Netherlands
Port cities and towns of the North Sea